Doratogonus is a genus of millipedes in family Spirostreptidae. Many of the species are listed on the IUCN Red List due to habitat destruction.

Species
CR: critically endangered; EN: endangered; VU: vulnerable; LC: least concern; DD: data deficient.

References

Further reading

External links
Major black millipede (Doratogonus major) - Arkive.org

Spirostreptida
Millipedes of Africa
Endangered animals
Millipede genera
Taxonomy articles created by Polbot